Vikram Singh (born 23 April 1983) is an Indian producer, director and composer. He works upon singles, films, TV commercials and radio jingles.

He is the brother of Gajendra Verma, singer of the viral song "Emptiness – Tune Mere Jaana" and other famous singles like "Ik Kahani", "Anjaam", "Mera Jahan," and the most famous 2018 hit, "Tera Ghata".

Early life
Vikram Singh Verma was born in Sirsa, Haryana, India, to Dr. Surender Verma, a poet, writer, teacher and theater personality, and Chand Verma. Vikram's love for music and his father's able guidance worked wonders and at the age of three began his homeschooling for music. While still in school he started his vocal training under his guru Prof. Bakshi. 

By the age of 15, he had completed his Visharad in music and started composing for school and college plays as well. He also performed at several state-level college competitions and won numerous awards for Best Harmonium Player, Best Vocalist, Best Keyboardist, by Kurukshetra University, Haryana.

After completing his graduation, along with his family he moved to Jaipur where he finished his master's degree in music from University of Rajasthan and did initial grades from Trinity College London, Board of the Trinity College of Music.

Career
Earlier Vikram has worked as national sound designer for Indian FM radio channel 94.3 MyFm. He has produced more than 300 radio and TV jingles nationally and internationally. 

He is best known for his work as director/composer/producer for his brother Gajendra Verma's hit singles like "Emptiness – Tune Mere Jaana" which was a viral song and got instant million of hits and downloads on the internet, "Phir Suna", "Saajna Re", "Tujse Door Jo Hota hu", "Tera Ghata" and many more. and Tera Hi Rahun. 

As a music composer he has worked for Bollywood films and background scores and themes for Indian TV serials on Channel V, Sony, Zee TV, Starplus and DD National. In May 2013, as composer he collaborated with Indian rap artist Yo Yo Honey Singh for the song "Kudi Tu Butter" which went on to be a part of the Hindi feature film Bajatey Raho. In 2014–15 he composed music for Bollywood films like Chor Bazari and Guddu Ki Gun.

Discography

Singles

Movies

Awards
Winner "Golden Mike Award 2012-13" For Creative Radio Production.
Winner "Golden Mike Award 2010-11" For Creative Radio Production.
Excellency Award for Hero Cycle Jingle. (Aired in 8 Different Languages all over India.)
Winner 1st Prize for "9th River To River Short film Festival- Italy". (Judged by Film Maker Azeez Mirza.)
Winner 2nd Prize for "National Creative Ad Making Competition".(Judged by Ad Film Maker Prahalad Kakkar.)
New-York International Radio Awards 2011.

References

1983 births
Living people
People from Sirsa, Haryana
University of Rajasthan alumni
21st-century Indian composers
Indian radio producers
Indian advertising directors